China recognizes neither same-sex marriage nor civil unions. Since 1 October 2017, couples have been able to sign guardianship agreements offering partners some limited legal benefits, including decisions about medical and personal care, death and funeral, property management, and maintenance of rights and interests.

The same-sex partner of a Hong Kong resident is able to obtain a dependent visa. Same-sex spouses of government employees also receive the same spousal benefits, which includes medical care and joint tax assessment, as heterosexual spouses. Hong Kong courts have also ruled in favor of equal treatment for same-sex couples in terms of inheritance and parental recognition after the breakdown of the relationship.

Immigration, tax and inheritance rights

Beijing
Beijing provides dependent residency status to the same-sex foreign partners of legal foreign residents. It is not clear whether this extends to the foreign partner of a local Chinese resident. In 2013, beginning on 1 July, foreign same-sex partners (including married couples) of current residents became eligible for residency status in Beijing under a "dependent resident status". This law only applies to the municipality of Beijing. The key beneficiaries were expected to be white-collar foreign expats whose partners and spouses were able to accompany them and gain residency status in Beijing as a result of the law.

Hong Kong

In 2014, Hong Kong immigration officer Angus Leung Chun-kwong married his same-sex partner, Scott Adams, in New Zealand. After the wedding, Leung attempted to update his marital status with the Civil Service Bureau, whose policy states that officers' partners can receive spousal benefits, which includes medical care and joint tax assessment. The Bureau rejected Leung's attempts to extend these benefits to Adams, prompting a legal challenge, Leung Chun Kwong v Secretary for the Civil Service, in court. On 6 June 2019, after conflicting decisions from lower courts, the Court of Final Appeal ruled that the Civil Service Bureau and the Inland Revenue Department had unlawfully discriminated against the couple, and ruled that the same-sex spouse of a government employee should receive the same spousal benefits as an opposite-sex spouse would. In 2020, the Inland Revenue Department issued regulations as a result of the court decision stating that "any married person – regardless if he or she is in a heterosexual marriage or same-sex marriage – is now entitled to elect joint assessment or personal assessment jointly with the person's spouse, as well as to claim allowances or deductions in respect of his or her spouse. In addition, he or she is also eligible to sponsor his or her spouse for a dependant visa/entry permit for entry into Hong Kong."

A Hong Kong court ruled in September 2017 that a lesbian expatriate worker could live in the territory with her partner as a dependant and ordered the government to issue her a spousal visa. The ruling was labelled "a big win" by Raymond Chan Chi-chuen, Hong Kong's first openly gay lawmaker. The Hong Kong Government appealed the ruling in November 2017, and it was upheld in July 2018 by the Court of Final Appeal in QT v Director of Immigration. The ruling became effective on 19 September 2018. In September 2020, the Hong Kong High Court ruled that same-sex couples should receive equal treatment under inheritance law. The case challenged the city's inheritance and intestacy laws which forbade a gay person from inheriting the estate of their partner without a will. Judge Anderson Chow Ka-ming ruled in Ng Hon Lam Edgar v Secretary for Justice that the policy was "unlawful discrimination". In May 2021, the Court of First Instance ruled in favor of equal parental rights over the children of lesbian couples in S v KG. The court ruled that following the breakdown of the relationship the non-biological mother should be granted joint custody, shared care and guardianship rights of her children with her ex-partner, despite not being legally recognized as the children's mother.

Guardianship system

In March 2017, the National People's Congress amended Chinese law so that "all adults of full capacity are given the liberty of appointing their own guardians by mutual agreement." Previously, only those over the age of 60 or with reduced mental capacity could nominate a legal guardian. Specifically, article 33 of the amended law, which went into effect on 1 October 2017, states:
An adult with full capacity for civil conduct may, in prior consultation with his/her close relatives, or other individuals or organisations who are willing to act as his/her guardian, determine his/her guardian in writing. The agreed guardian shall perform the guardianship duties when such adult loses or partially loses his/her capacity for civil conduct.

The system, called "legal guardianship" or "guardianship agreement" (pinyin:), permits same-sex partners to make important decisions about medical and personal care, death and funeral, property management, and maintenance of rights and interests. In case one partner loses the ability to make crucial decisions (i.e. mental or physical illness or accident), his or her guardian may decide for them in their best interest. Their legal relationship can also include wealth and inheritance, or pension, depending on which additional legal documents the couple decides to sign, such as a will.Some notary offices require couples to have lived together for several years or that both partners are out to their families as requirements to sign such an agreement.

Chinese LGBT activists have welcomed the move, calling it an "important, positive first step". Peng Yazi, director of LGBT Rights Advocacy China, said after having signed guardianship papers with his partner that "if anything happens to one of us, we know our basic rights are protected". As of August 2019, guardianship agreements have been signed in Jiangsu (the first one was registered in Nanjing in late 2017), Hunan, Sichuan, Guangdong, Shanghai, Hubei and Beijing, among others. The practice is more common among older same-sex couples or couples who have been in a relationship for several years. According to a 2019 online opinion poll on Sina Weibo, which garnered over 5 million responses, 85% of respondents were in favour of the guardianship system, while 5% were opposed; the rest being undecided.

Same-sex marriage

Background
There are documented cases of same-sex unions in Ancient China. During the Song era, there are tales of two men, Pan Zhang and Wang Zhongxian, who fell in love and lived together in a relationship described as "affectionate as husband and wife, sharing the same coverlet and pillow with unbounded intimacy for one another". In modern times, the earliest known advocate for same-sex unions was the 19th to 20th century utopian reformer, Kang Youwei, who advocated temporary marriage contracts lasting up for a year. These contracts would be open to same-sex couples as well as to heterosexual couples. However, he did not believe that China was ready for such a historic step, and deferred this policy until the future Great Unity.

On 13 January 2010, the China Daily published a front-page splash photo of a Chinese couple, Zeng Anquan, a divorced architect aged 45, and Pan Wenjie, a demobilized People's Liberation Army soldier aged 27, being married in a gay bar in Chengdu. The marriage is understood as having no legal basis in the country, and the families of both men reacted negatively to the news of their marriage.

According to certain estimates from 2010, about 80% to 90% of Chinese gay men were married to women, who are known in Chinese as tongqi. These marriages, often called "sham marriages", are attributed to the fact that there is significant social pressure from family to marry and to found a family with a partner of the opposite sex. In most of these cases, the women are unaware of their husband's sexual orientation. In 2012, a professor at Sichuan University committed suicide after her husband came out as gay. In some cases, lesbians and gay men deliberately choose to marry each other. LGBT rights groups have urged gay men not to enter these "sham marriages", as they are "a tragedy for both the gay men and the women".

During the COVID-19 pandemic, the U.S. state of Utah established an online civil marriage service for couples wishing to marry. The marriage is officiated by Zoom and for an additional fee the couple can obtain an apostille validation stamp for the marriage license provided by Utah state authorities. By October 2022, around 200 same-sex couples in China had married via this online service, though the marriages have no legal status in China. The move has also become particularly popular in Israel where same-sex marriages performed abroad are legally recognised.

Legal challenges
On 5 January 2016, a court in Changsha, Hunan, agreed to hear a lawsuit filed in December 2015 against the Bureau of Civil Affairs of Furong District. The lawsuit was filed by 26-year-old Sun Wenlin, who in June 2015 had been refused permission by the bureau to marry his 36-year-old partner, Hu Mingliang. On 13 April 2016, with hundreds of same-sex marriage supporters outside, the Changsha court ruled against Sun, who said he would appeal. On May 17, 2016, Sun and Hu were married in a private ceremony in Changsha, expressing their intention to organize another 99 same-sex weddings across the country in order to normalize same-sex marriage in China.

On 12 April 2021, the Shenyang Intermediate People's Court in Shenyang, Liaoning ruled that a 79-year-old woman could not sue her female partner of 50 years, whom she accused of stealing ¥294,000 from her bank account, because their relationship is not recognized as a marriage in China. Ouyang Jintong, a lawyer at Beijing Yingke Law Firm, said the court should have considered the length of the couple's relationship and cohabitation while arriving at its verdict, stating, "The couple lived together, shared wealth, comforted each other, and relied on each other in their twilight years, but their union could not be recognized as marriage because they were of the same sex, even though their lives were consistent with the essence of marriage."

Legal proposals
The Marriage Law of the People's Republic of China (pinyin:) defined marriage as between a man and a woman, but this law was repealed in 2021.

Li Yinhe, a sexology scholar well known in the Chinese LGBT community, proposed the Chinese Same-Sex Marriage Bill as an amendment to the marriage law at the Chinese People's Political Consultative Conference in 2003, 2005, 2006 and 2008. All four proposals failed because she was unable to find enough cosponsors for a placement on the agenda. Li pledged to "continue proposing the bill until it is passed". In 2008, supporters of LGBT rights launched a campaign to collect signatures calling for the recognition of same-sex marriage. In 2012, Li launched a new campaign to raise support for same-sex marriage legislation.

There were unsuccessful attempts to include provisions legalising same-sex marriage in the new Civil Code in 2020. In August 2019, a parliament spokesman said that "limiting marriage to a relationship between a man and a woman will remain China's legal position". In December 2019, LGBT activists announced they had gathered over 200,000 signatures in support of same-sex marriage. Later that month, Yue Zhongming, spokesman for the Commission for Legislative Affairs of the National People's Congress Standing Committee, said that the National People's Congress would review the possibility of opening marriage to same-sex couples in March 2020 and opened the topic to public comments. Several government-related Sina Weibo accounts launched online opinion polls to gauge public support for same-sex marriage, with results as of 22 December 2019 being a ratio of 6 to 4 in favor. Results of an online Phoenix Network survey, which had garnered close to 10 million votes, showed a 67% majority in favor of same-sex marriage. In May 2020, an official from the Standing Committee of the National People's Congress claimed that the signatures and comments in support of same-sex marriage the committee had received were "copied and pasted" and said that the ban on same-sex marriage would be maintained. Article 1046 of the code states: "A man and a woman shall enter into marriage freely and voluntarily. Neither party may compel the other party to enter into marriage against his will, and no organization or individual may interfere with the freedom of marriage."

Government attitude
The attitude of the Government of China towards homosexuality is believed to be "three nos": "No approval; no disapproval; no promotion". Despite the Chinese Society of Psychiatry having removed homosexuality from its list of mental illnesses in 2001, such change is yet to be reflected by the regulations of the National Health and Family Planning Commission. A government spokesperson, when asked about Li Yinhe's same-sex marriage proposal, said that same-sex marriage was still too "ahead of time" for China. He argued that same-sex marriage was not recognized even in many Western countries, which are considered much more liberal on social issues than China. This statement is understood as an implication that the government may consider recognition of same-sex marriage in the long run, but not in the near future. In addition, the Chinese Government requires parents adopting children from China to be in heterosexual marriages.

The Chinese Government did invite the Prime Minister of Iceland, Jóhanna Sigurðardóttir, and her wife Jónína Leósdóttir on an official state visit in April 2013. Jónína was largely absent from official media coverage of the visit but she was fully recognized as the wife of the Prime Minister and was received as such at official functions, official residences and a reception at Beijing Foreign Studies University.

After the Taiwanese Constitutional Court ruled in May 2017 that banning same-sex marriage is unconstitutional under the Constitution of the Republic of China, attitudes were largely positive on the popular social media platform Sina Weibo. Li Yinhe claimed that a majority of Chinese people under the age of 35 supported same-sex marriage. Pointing out that the average age of members of the National People's Congress was 49, she concluded that same-sex marriage was "only 14 years away". Days after the same-sex marriage law came into effect in Taiwan in May 2019, the People's Daily, the Communist Party's newspaper, posted a celebratory tweet, "local lawmakers in Taiwan, China, have legalized same-sex marriage in a first for Asia." The tweet, which included a rainbow-colored GIF that read "love is love" angered the Foreign Minister of Taiwan, Joseph Wu, who retaliated, "WRONG! The bill was passed by our national parliament & will be signed by the president soon. Democratic #Taiwan is a country in itself & has nothing to do with authoritarian #China. @PDChina is a commie brainwasher & it sucks. JW." Nonetheless, Chinese authorities signaled that it would not follow Taiwan's lead on same-sex marriage. An Fengshan, spokesman for China's Taiwan Affairs Office, said the government "noted reports on the island" about same-sex marriage and that "the mainland has a marriage system of one man, one woman". Following the legalisation of same-sex marriage in Taiwan in May 2019, some Chinese LGBT activists estimated that China is "at least a decade away" from legalising same-sex marriages, with the current priorities on introducing anti-discrimination laws, letting LGBT groups raise awareness without fear and censorship, and banning conversion therapy.

Public opinion
A poll conducted in 2009 showed that over 30% of the Beijing population supported same-sex marriage, while the rest were unsure or opposed. A 2014 survey found that 74% of Hong Kong residents supported granting same-sex couples either all or some of the benefits associated with marriage.

A 2015 Ipsos opinion poll found that 29% of Chinese people supported same-sex marriage, and another 29% supported civil unions or partnerships which would offer some of the rights of marriage. 21% were against any legal recognition for same-sex couples. The poll reflects the online population which tends to be more urban. Support is higher among young people, with a September–October 2016 survey by the Varkey Foundation showing that 54% of 18–21-year-olds supported same-sex marriage in China. 

A 2017 poll conducted by the University of Hong Kong found that 50.4% of Hong Kong residents supported same-sex marriage.

An online opinion poll from Phoenix Network in December 2019, which garnered close to 10 million votes, showed a 67% majority in favor of same-sex marriage in China. A May 2021 Ipsos poll showed that 43% of Chinese people supported same-sex marriage, 20% supported civil partnerships but not marriage, while 19% were opposed to all legal recognition for same-sex couples, and 18% were undecided.

See also
LGBT rights in China
Homosexuality in China
Same-sex marriage in Taiwan
Recognition of same-sex unions in Hong Kong
Recognition of same-sex unions in Asia

Notes

References

China
Marriage, unions and partnerships in China
LGBT rights in the People's Republic of China